Templeoran also known as Piercefield or Templeoran is a townland in County Westmeath, Ireland. It should not be confused with Piercefield, a townland in the neighbouring civil parish of Leny.

Templeoran is one of 12 townlands of the civil parish of Templeoran in the barony of Moygoish in the Province of Leinster. The neighbouring townlands are: Farrow, Grange and Piercefield to the north, Balrath and Grangegeeth to the east, Ballyedward, Johnstown and Sonna Demesne to the south and Ballyhug to the west.

In the 1911 census of Ireland there were 14 houses and 67 inhabitants in the townland.

References

External links
Piercefield or Templeoran at openstreetmap.org
Templeoran at the IreAtlas Townland Data Base
Templeoran at Townlands.ie
Templeoran at Logainm.ie

Townlands of County Westmeath